John Francis Christopher Ducker (born 16 March 1943), known professionally as John Leeson, is an English actor, voice artist and freelance wine educator. He is known for portraying Bungle in Rainbow and voicing K9 in Doctor Who and spin-offs The Sarah Jane Adventures and K9.

Early career 
Leeson trained at Royal Academy of Dramatic Art and his varied stage and television career spans half a century. It includes work in both repertory and West End productions including Neil Simon's Plaza Suite (1969), Flint (1970) and Don't Start Without Me (1971), and character acting work across a wide range of television sitcoms and costume dramas from the 1970s onwards, including Dad's Army, Sorry!, Rings on Their Fingers, adaptations of The Barretts of Wimpole Street and Vanity Fair, Shadow of the Noose, Crown Court and Longitude. He also embarked on a parallel career in voiceover work, freelancing as a continuity announcer with BFBS Television in Germany, BBC Television, and Channel 4.

Doctor Who and spin-offs

Leeson was first brought on as the voice of K9 in Doctor Who for 1977's The Invisible Enemy. Producer Graham Williams liked the character that the decision was made to retain him as a regular character to appeal to the younger members of the audience. Tom Baker, who played the Fourth Doctor, detested the character of K9, but gets on well with Leeson (when Leeson appeared on Tom Baker's edition of This Is Your Life in 2000, he entered on all fours). 

Leeson became worried about how appearing only as the voice of the character would hinder future employment if he was not appearing in visible roles; he left the programme after the conclusion of the 16th season in 1979. He was, however  seen on-screen that season as the character Dugeen during the serial The Power of Kroll (1978–1979). David Brierly took over for four stories (one of which was never completed due to a BBC strike) the following year. When John Nathan-Turner took over as producer of the series for season 18 in 1980, Leeson agreed to return before the character was written out.

Leeson also agreed to voice K9 in K-9 and Company (1981), a spin-off from Doctor Who which was not picked up after the airing of its pilot episode. He later voiced K9 for a cameo appearance in the 20th anniversary episode of Doctor Who, The Five Doctors, and has since reprised K9's voice in two BBV and several Big Finish audio dramas including Zagreus and the Gallifrey series. 

He voiced K9 for the character's return in the 2006 Doctor Who episode "School Reunion", leading to giving him recurring character status in The Sarah Jane Adventures. Leeson's then reprised K9 again in the episode "Journey's End". The most recent occasion of Leeson voicing K9 is in the spin-off television series K9. Leeson also voiced K9 in a Doctor Who-themed episode of The Weakest Link.
He did not reprise his role as K9 in Lego Dimensions as he was unavailable at the time, so archive audio was used instead.

Leeson's vocal contributions to Doctor Who can also be heard as other characters in the serials The Invisible Enemy and Remembrance of the Daleks. Leeson played the role of "Prosecutor 2" in the 2005 stage production of The Trial of Davros and has compiled a one-man show, A Dog's Life, directed by Richard Fawkes.

In November 2013, Leeson appeared as K9 in the one-off 50th anniversary comedy homage The Five(ish) Doctors Reboot.

Other credits 

Other credits include appearances in Blake's 7 (in the season A episode "Mission to Destiny" and the season B episode "Gambit"). Also, notably in children's programmes, ITV's Rainbow from 1972 as the original Bungle, and the BBC's Jigsaw in which he voiced Jigg, the show's "mascot" and played the giant Biggum, who was so tall only his feet were seen and his voice heard. He was one of the resident team of actors in stunts for ITV's Game for a Laugh (1981–85), appearing in one memorable stunt involving a car transporter wrecking his car and blaming it on the unsuspecting victim.

His film credits are few but included the Hunt Secretary in the film of Tarka the Otter (1979), and a TV interviewer in the film version of Whoops Apocalypse (1986). His radio work includes the comedy serial All That Jazz (1990) in which he played the character of Mike and additionally provided the scripted continuity link at the beginning. 

Leeson has read extensively for the audio book charity Calibre Audio Library, and is also the narrator/character voices behind The Space Gypsy Adventures on Children's UK hospital radio. In 2010 John appeared in a character role in the independent film Rebels Without A Clue with actor Rik Barnett.

Away from stage and screen he was regularly heard as continuity announcer on Channel 4 when his warm tones proved a distinct contrast to the K9 voice. A lively interest in both classical music and particularly wine, led him to develop a longstanding parallel career as a wine educator.

Under his birth name he is an accredited tutor for the Wine & Spirit Education Trust, and he is a member both of the Association of Wine Educators and the Circle of Wine Writers. He is a freelance lecturer in wine both on land and in cruises at sea, and is a regular tutor for The Wine Education Service Ltd.

Literature
Leeson's autobiography, entitled Flight of the Budgerigar, was published by Hirst in October 2011. It was superseded by an updated and expanded version entitled Tweaking the Tail which was published in July 2013 by Fantom Films. 

A book of favourite recipes collected across the years, Dog's Dinners (the title referencing his work as the voice of K9), also published by Fantom, was published in May 2014. 

An enthusiastic cook, he also contributed a chapter on teaching wine tasting (in his birth name of John Ducker) to Educated Tastes: Food, Drink and Connoisseur Culture, edited by Jeremy Strong, and published by the University of Nebraska Press.

Personal life 
In 1969, Leeson married Judy Griffiths, an assistant at the BBC. Their son, Guy Ducker (born 1972), is a film editor and director.

Public service 
Now statutorily retired, he also served as a local justice of the peace for over 25 years, having served as Deputy Chairman of his local Bench (Ealing) for six years across the period. 

In 2002 and 2010, under his birth name of John Ducker, he stood as a candidate for the Liberal Democrats in the district of Perivale in the local council elections for Ealing London Borough Council, but failed to be elected.

Filmography

Television

Video games

Film

References

External links

BBC press release announcing the return of K9

1943 births
20th-century English male actors
21st-century English male actors
Alumni of RADA
English male television actors
English male voice actors
Liberal Democrats (UK) people
Living people
Male actors from Leicestershire
People from Leicester
Radio and television announcers